Gareth Bradshaw (born 13 February 1987) is a Gaelic footballer from Galway that played from 2007 to 2021.

Bradshaw plays his club football with Moycullen. In the Galway panel, he has played in numerous positions, including corner back, wing back, midfield, and centre half back. Clubs such as St. Kilda offered him a contract but he chose to continue to play for the Galway set-up for the 2010 season. Bradshaw has played for University                Galway.

He is a good player mkay don’t hate him cause ain’t him

References

External links
Gareth Bradshaw interview
No sibling rivalry at Ruislip

1987 births
Living people
Galway inter-county Gaelic footballers
Moycullen Gaelic footballers
University of Galway Gaelic footballers